Harold Wallace McDonald (born September 7, 1975) is a Costa Rican former footballer who played as a right-back and central midfielder.

Club career
He started his career with Deportivo Saprissa, being part of their minor league system. After a season with Saprissa and then Belén, he was transferred alongside compatriot Jewisson Bennett to Zacatepec, of Mexico's professional football league. He then came back and signed with Saprissa's arch-rivals Alajuelense, earning a place in the starting line-up really quick and remained with the team for 7 years. From 2002, he spent a year on loan playing for San Luis in the Mexican Primera División before making a second return to Alajuelense. He later withdraw a lawsuit against his club, after claiming part of the transfer fee paid by San Luis to Alajuelense. He would end up playing a total of 424 league games and 80 international games for Liga.

In summer 2008 Wallace joined other high-profile players at ambitious Liberia Mía and he retired in summer 2010 after playing his final two seasons at the then renamed Águilas Guanacastecas.

International career
Wallace was a member of Costa Rica's youth national teams, playing in the 1995 FIFA World Youth Championship finals in the Qatar.

He made his senior debut for Costa Rica in a September 1995 friendly match against Jamaica and earned a total of 101 caps, scoring 3 goals. He represented his country in 28 FIFA World Cup qualification matches and played in the 2002 and 2006 FIFA World Cups. He also played at two Copa América tournaments, four CONCACAF Gold Cups and three UNCAF Nations Cups.

His final international was an August 2009 FIFA World Cup qualification match against Honduras, after reaching a century of caps in his previous game against Mexico.

International goals
Scores and results list. Costa Rica's goal tally first.

Managerial career
In July 2014, Wallace and Pablo Sanz took the reins of the Costa Rica national under-20 football team after coach Rónald "Macho" Mora was sacked.

See also
 List of men's footballers with 100 or more international caps

References

External links
 
 

1975 births
Living people
People from Heredia Province
Association football defenders
Costa Rican footballers
Costa Rica international footballers
1997 Copa América players
2001 Copa América players
2002 CONCACAF Gold Cup players
2002 FIFA World Cup players
2003 UNCAF Nations Cup players
2003 CONCACAF Gold Cup players
2005 CONCACAF Gold Cup players
2006 FIFA World Cup players
2007 UNCAF Nations Cup players
2007 CONCACAF Gold Cup players
2009 CONCACAF Gold Cup players
Copa Centroamericana-winning players
Deportivo Saprissa players
Belén F.C. players
Club Atlético Zacatepec players
L.D. Alajuelense footballers
San Luis F.C. players
Municipal Liberia footballers
Liga MX players
FIFA Century Club
Costa Rican expatriate footballers
Expatriate footballers in Mexico
Costa Rican expatriate sportspeople in Mexico
Liga FPD players
1998 CONCACAF Gold Cup players